Around 2006, the Chinese Government instituted the admission of foreign students to China for medical instruction using English as the language of instruction. Students are eligible to earn basic degrees in either Medicine (MBBS) or Dentistry (BDS).

To ensure adequate quality control, only a few choice medical schools are allowed specific quotas for admitting international students into these programs. Other Chinese medical institutions are not barred from admitting international students, but the government maintains that these other students would have to be admitted into the medical programs taught in Chinese.

This list of universities is reviewed each year and currently stands at 50 schools.

These schools are thus officially recognized by the WHO and the MOE.

In fact, in China, only English medium universities are legally allowed to teach foreign students in English by the Ministry of Education (MOE), and these universities are also called “MOE Listed Universities”, only these universities can offer programs for M.B.B.S degrees as well.

References

External links
 The list of institutions certified for the 2012/2013 academic year.

Medical education in China
Universities in China with English-medium medical schools